The 2009 Indian general election in Manipur, occurred for 2 seats in the state.

Candidates of the Indian National Congress triumphed in the election to both the Parliamentary constituencies with Dr Thokchom Meinya Singh retaining the Inner seat and Thangso Baite wresting the Outer Parliamentary seat from Mani Charenamei of the People's Democratic Alliance.
After completion of counting of votes cast by the electorates of Manipur in the 15th Lok Sabha elections, Dr Meinya defeated his nearest rival Dr Moirangthem Nara Singh of CPI by 40,960 votes with Thangso Baite favoured by  voters compared to  votes cast for Charenamei.
Thangso Baite's victory margin by  votes over Charenamei is also more than the figure of defeat suffered by the Congress candidate to the same rival in the previous poll.

Results

Constituency wise

Details

Inner manipur parliamentary Constituency

Out of the 32 assembly segments in the Inner Manipur Parliamentary constituency, Dr Meinya received maximum mandate of 16,280 votes out of the total strength of 22,726 electors in Andro assembly constituency whereas 16,136 voters of Thoubal AC stamped their approval to the eventual winner. The third highest votes gained by the Congress MP was in Khundrakpam AC where 10,393 voted in his favour.
Dr Meinya, who elicited significant support in all the 32 assembly segments got the fewest  2626 votes from the electorates of Singjamei AC.
The Congress candidate had won the same parliamentary seat in the previous Lok Sabha election (2004) with a victory margin of a little over 49,000. Dr nara was the nearest rival at that time, too.
In the recent hustings, Dr Nara generated fair support in all the assembly segments where the average voting trend was over the 3000 mark with the exception of Nambol AC where he was preferred by only 1618 adults.
Maximum number of Nambol electorates favoured former Parliamentarian Thounaojam Chaoba Singh. Chaoba who contested the 15th Lok Sabha election on MPP ticket polled 10,988 votes. The figure, in his home polling station, was also the most chaoba polled in the election. In spite of being the consensus candidate of a handful of national as well as regional political parties Chaoba finished a distant third tipping the one lakh barrier by only 1787 votes.
Out of the total of  votes polled by Dr Nara, the CPI stalwart received maximum support of Lilong AC electorates with 10,898 from a total of 21,451 votes favouring the former Art and Culture Minister.
Mandate of Thongju AC electorates too tilted heavily in favour of Dr Nara with 10,142 votes cast for the CPI nominee out of the total of 18,210.
Election to the Inner Manipur parliamentary constituency for the 15th Lok Sabha was held on 22 April with a total of seven candidates in the fray.
Former Chief Minister and BJP nominee W Nipamacha, L Kshetrani devi (RBCP), Abdul Rahman (Independent) and N Homendro (Ind) were the other candidates.
Dr Meinya also led in all the four districts where franchise for the inner Parliamentary Constituency was conducted. The difference of victory margin between Dr Meinya and Dr Nara was the largest in Imphal East district with 10,298 votes separating the winner and nearest vanquished.
On the other hand, Imphal West witnessed the fiercest contest between the two as the difference stood at only 2144 votes.

Outer Manipur Parliamentary constituency

Out of 28 assembly segments in the Outer seat, Thangso Baite received mandate of  voters to represent them in the Parliament.
Outer Parliamentary Constituency is also composed of six assembly segments of Thoubal district and Jiribam subdivision of Imphal East district, and Scheduled Tribe assembly segments spread across Tamenglong, Chandel, Ukhrul, Senapati and Churachandpur districts.
Thangso, who faltered against Mani Charenamei in the 14th Lok Sabha election by 82,193 votes secured the maximum of 27,516 votes from electorates of Saikul AC against 15,607 for Charenamei in the 15th Lok Sabha election. Compared to his nearest rival, Thangso was least influential among Mao AC electors where only 850 votes were polled for the INC candidate.
On the other hand, the sitting MP was heavily favoured by the electors of Chingai AC in Ukhrul district as the maximum of 22,194 votes were cast for the PDA nominee. The least vote Charenamei managed from among the 28 assembly segments was in Sugnu AC under Thoubal district with only 106 voters choosing the PDA candidate. The INC candidate had substantial lead in 17 of the ACs whereas Charenamei led in eight, LB sona of the Nationalist Congress Party in two and Loli Adanee of the BJP in one. Election for the Outer Manipur Parliamentary (ST) Constituency was held on 16 April with a total of nine candidates in the fray. The other candidates are BJP's D Loli Adanee (93,052), NCP's LB Sona (79,849), RJD's MY Haokip (4859), LJP's Thangkhagin (1252), Valley Rose (Ind/4735), M Rose Haokip (Ind/1128) and L Gangte (Ind/2070).

References

Manipur
Indian general elections in Manipur
2000s in Manipur